France Bleu Orléans is a generalist public service radio station based in Orléans. It serves the departments of Loiret and Loir-et-Cher

History 

Radio France Orléans transmitted its first broadcasts on February 4, 1985. It succeeded Radio Center which had been broadcasting since June 9 1980, operated by FR3. The station retroceded to Radio France in 1983.

Frequencies 
France Bleu Orléans broadcasts its programs on the FM band using, depending on the geographical area, the following transmission frequencies:

 Orleans / Loiret: 100.9 MHz
 Blois: 93.9 MHz
 Gien: 103.6 MHz
 Montargis: 106.8 MHz

References 

Radio stations in France